Al-Monitor is a news website launched in February 2012 by the Arab American entrepreneur Jamal Daniel and based in Washington, DC, United States. Al-Monitor provides reporting and analysis from and about the Middle East.

History and organization
Al-Monitor was launched on 13 February 2012 by the Arab-American Jamal Daniel (who was born in Syria, but grew up in Lebanon). It was founded with the intention to publish a diverse set of perspectives on the region, bridging the gap of information available to both those in the Middle East and those elsewhere with a desire to better understand a rapidly changing region.

In 2018, Al-Monitor partnered with North Base Media which was founded by Marcus Brauchli and Sasa Vucinic in managing Al-Monitor in order "to provide top-level operational and financial decision-making, and work with the company to explore possible content and commercial avenues."

At its founding, the site also translated content from countries in the Middle East; however, the site now only provides original content and does not translate from partners. Among its media partners were El Khabar, Al-Masry Al-Youm, Azzaman, Calcalist, Yedioth Ahronoth, Al-Qabas, An-Nahar, As-Safir (now closed), Al-Hayat, Al-Iktissad Wal-Aamal, Habertürk, Milliyet, Radikal (now closed), Sabah, Taraf (now closed), Al Khaleej, and Al-Tagheer.

Content
Al-Monitor features reporting and analysis by journalists and experts from the Middle East, with special focus sections (that Al-Monitor terms "pulses") on Egypt, the Persian Gulf, Iran, Iraq, Israel, Jordan, Lebanon, North Africa, Palestine, Syria, Turkey as well as Russia's relationship with the Middle East.

In 2015, Al-Monitor relaunched its website and expanded coverage to include further reporting on Washington, the addition of a culture section, a new podcast and video coverage.

Contributors have included Vitaly Naumkin, director of the Institute of Oriental Studies, Russian Academy of Sciences; Kadri Gursel, formerly and editor with Cumhuriyet; Bruce Riedel of the Brookings Institution; Amberin Zaman, formerly a Turkey correspondent for The Economist; Sultan al Qassemi, former columnist with the United Arab Emirates–based The National and one of Times 140 Best Twitter Feeds of 2011 selections; Barbara Slavin, former diplomatic correspondent for USA Today and senior fellow at the Atlantic Council; Laura Rozen, a former foreign policy reporter for Politico, Foreign Policy, and Yahoo; and Madawi al-Rasheed, professor of social anthropology at King's College London; the late Cairo-based political analyst Bassem Sabry, an Egyptian writer who wrote extensively on Egypt and the Arab Spring; Akiva Eldar, a long-time Israeli political columnist formerly with Haaretz, and Gaza-based Asmaa al-Ghoul.

The site also conducts interviews with newsmakers, including former Deputy Secretary of State William J. Burns; former Director of Policy Planning for the U.S. State Department Anne-Marie Slaughter; former U.S. Senator Chuck Hagel; and Mustafa Barghouti, one-time candidate for Palestinian Authority president.

Awards 
In 2014, the International Press Institute awarded Al-Monitor its Free Media Pioneer Award, stating that Al-Monitor's "unrivalled reporting and analysis exemplify the invaluable role that innovative and vigorously independent media can play in times of change and upheaval".

In 2017, the Online News Association awarded Al-Monitor an Online Journalism Award for Best Explanatory Reporting for the series: "Middle East Lobbying: The Influence Game". The Society for Advancing Business Editing and Writing awarded Al-Monitor a Best in Business Award for its Middle East lobbying newsletter in 2019.

Reception
In January 2013, Ian Burrell of The Independent called Al-Monitor "an ambitious website that pulls together the commentary of distinguished writers from across the region." In 2012, former The Washington Post foreign affairs blogger Max Fisher called Al-Monitor "an invaluable Web-only publication following the Middle East." The Huffington Post has referred to Al-Monitor as "increasingly a daily must-read for insightful commentary on the Middle East," and The Economist recommended Al-Monitor's Egypt and Iran coverage in its What to Read section.

References

2012 establishments in Washington, D.C.
Publications established in 2012
American news websites
Mass media in the Middle East